Pork bone soup may refer to one of the following Asian noodle soups:

 Gamjatang (감자탕), a Korean soup
 Kyay oh, a Burmese noodle soup
 Tonkotsu (豚骨), a Japanese noodle broth